Sister Irene O'Connor  is an Australian Roman Catholic nun from the Franciscan Missionaries of Mary order and a musician. In addition to traditional hymns, O'Connor is known for mixing religious music with popular music, most famously on the 1976 album Fire of God's Love. Fire of God's Love and O'Connor's story were covered in an Australian Broadcasting Corporation segment.

Career 
Sister Irene O'Connor recorded several albums during the 1960s while teaching children in Singapore. While in Singapore she met Sister Marimil Lobregat who was en route to Indonesia. The two became friends, and recorded Fire of God's Love after reconnecting a decade later. The two recorded the album entirely on their own, with O'Connor writing, singing and performing all instruments on the recording, and Lobregat handling all of the recording, engineering and sound production.

References 

Franciscan Missionaries of Mary
Living people
Australian musicians
21st-century Australian Roman Catholic nuns
Year of birth missing (living people)
20th-century Australian Roman Catholic nuns